Novobirilyussy is a rural locality (a selo) and the administrative center of Birilyussky District, Krasnoyarsk Krai, Russia. Population:

References

Notes

Sources

Rural localities in Krasnoyarsk Krai
Birilyussky District